The Tarrant County Courthouse is part of the Tarrant County government campus in Fort Worth, Texas, United States.

History

The Tarrant County Courthouse was designed by the architecture firm of Frederick C. Gunn and Louis Curtiss and built by the Probst Construction Company of Chicago, 1893–1895. It is a pink Texas granite building in Renaissance Revival style, closely resembling the Texas State Capitol with the exception of the clock tower. The cost was $408,840 and citizens considered it such a public extravagance that a new County Commissioners' Court was elected in 1894.

A monument dedicated to Confederate Army soldiers was erected on the grounds by the United Daughters of the Confederacy in 1953.  In 1958, a Civil Courts Building was constructed on the west side of the courthouse.  In 2012, a $4.5 million renovation to the clock tower was completed. In 2013, the Civil Courts Building was demolished.

The Tarrant County Courthouse currently houses the Tarrant County clerk's office, probate and county courts at law, a law library, and the Tarrant County facilities management department.

See also

National Register of Historic Places listings in Tarrant County, Texas
Recorded Texas Historic Landmarks in Tarrant County
Monument to Confederate war soldiers, Fort Worth

References

External links

Architecture in Fort Worth: Tarrant County Courthouse with exterior and interior photos

Buildings and structures in Fort Worth, Texas
Buildings and structures in Tarrant County, Texas
Courthouses on the National Register of Historic Places in Texas
National Register of Historic Places in Fort Worth, Texas
County courthouses in Texas
Clock towers in Texas